Henicorhynchus inornatus is a species of ray-finned fish in the genus Henicorhynchus, although some authorities classify it as member of the genus Cirrhinus. It is only found in the Irrawaddy and Sittang basins in Myanmar.

References

Henicorhynchus
Fish described in 1997